The Quintessential Quintuplets, also known as 5-Tōbun no Hanayome, is an anime television series based on the manga series of the same name written and illustrated by Negi Haruba. The anime series is licensed in North America under Crunchyroll-Funimation partnership.

The first 12-episode anime television series adaptation was announced in the combined 36th and 37th issue of Weekly Shōnen Magazine on August 8, 2018. The series was directed by Satoshi Kuwabara and written by Keiichirō Ōchi, featuring animation by Tezuka Productions, character designs by Michinosuke Nakamura and Gagakuga, and music by Natsumi Tabuchi, Hanae Nakamura, and Miki Sakurai. The series premiered from January 10 to March 28, 2019, on the TBS, SUN, and BS-TBS channels. Crunchyroll streamed the series with Funimation providing the English dub.

On May 5, 2019, a second season, the title of which is styled as The Quintessential Quintuplets ∬, was announced. Kaori is replacing Satoshi Kuwabara as the director of the season, and Keiichirō Ōchi is returning to write the scripts. Bibury Animation Studios is replacing Tezuka Productions as the animation studio. It premiered on January 8, 2021.

Series overview

Episode list

The Quintessential Quintuplets (2019)

The Quintessential Quintuplets 2 (2021)

Notes

References

External links

  
 
 

Lists of anime episodes